Oak Flat is an unincorporated community on the South Fork South Branch Potomac River located in Pendleton County, West Virginia, United States. Oak Flat lies along U.S. Highway 33.

References

Unincorporated communities in Pendleton County, West Virginia
Unincorporated communities in West Virginia